Kim Robertson is an American Celtic harp player. She was born in the U.S. state of Wisconsin and classically trained on piano and orchestral harp. Her work encompasses over 20 album projects, several volumes of harp arrangements, instructional videos, and an international itinerary of concerts and retreats.  She has recorded for several labels, including Gourd Music, Narada, Sugo, Invincible, and for the Crimson Series of Gurmukhi meditation music in collaboration with vocalist Singh Kaur. She has also collaborated with cellist Virginia Kron, with flutists Steve Kujala, Bettine Clemen, Brett Lipshutz, and in the Celtic trio Ferintosh with cellist Abby Newton and fiddler David Greenberg.

Discography 

Forget Not The Angels (2014) -Gourd Music
Christmas Lullaby, Vol II (2017) -Gourd Music
Shall We Gather (2012) -Gourd Music
Shady Grove (2009) – Gourd Music
Tender Shepherd (1972) – Gourd Music
Highland Heart (2006) – Gourd Music
Christmas Lullaby (2004) – Gourd Music
Searching for Lambs (2003) – Gourd Music
Q&A (2013) -with Sharlene Wallace
Fig for a Kiss (2019) -with Brett Lipshutz 
Dance to Your Shadow (2001)
Crimson Collection, Vols. 6 and 7 (1999) - with Singh Kaur 
The Spiral Gate (1999)
Lullaby Journey (1996)
Wood, Fire & Gold (1996)
Treasures of the Celtic Harp (1995)
Celtic Christmas II (1994)
Gratitude (1990)
Wild Iris (1989) - with Steve Kujala
Joy! Joy! Joy! (1995) - with Steve Kujala
Celtic Christmas I (1987)
Moonrise (1987)
Windshadows II (1986)
Windshadows Vol. 1 (1983)
Water Spirit (2008)
Angels in Disguise (2003)
Love Song to a Planet (2005) with Bettine Clemen

References

External links
Official site

Year of birth missing (living people)
Living people
American women classical pianists
American classical pianists
American harpists
Narada Productions artists
Musicians from Wisconsin
21st-century American women musicians